"Back Blocks" is Misia's 11th single. It was released on 20 November 2002. It peaked at #7 selling 30,846 copies in its first week. The third track, "Tobikata wo Wasureta Chiisana Tori" served as theme song for the PlayStation 2 game "Star Ocean: Till the End of Time".

Track list

Charts

External links 
 https://web.archive.org/web/20061117164950/http://www.rhythmedia.co.jp/misia/disc/ — Misia discography

2002 singles
Misia songs
Songs written by Misia
2002 songs